The Green Team is a fictional comic book team of rich-kid adventurers published by DC Comics. The team debuted in 1st Issue Special #2 (May 1975), and was created by Joe Simon and Jerry Grandenetti. In its initial appearance, the group was subtitled "Boy Millionaires". In 2010s comics, a revamped version of the group appeared in a series subtitled "Teen Trillionaires", thus adjusting for both inflation and the declining popularity of boy adventurers.

Publication history
The Green Team's first adventure appears in 1st Issue Special #2 (cover-dated May 1975), an anthology comic. For many years, this would be their only conventionally published appearance. Not long after their debut, a regular Green Team series went into production, but the DC Implosion prevented it from reaching store shelves. Two issues had been completed at the time the series was cancelled, and these saw publication of a sort in the first volume of Cancelled Comic Cavalcade (Fall 1978), a two-volume collection DC Comics printed on photocopiers to secure copyrights on the stack of unpublished material left over after the DC Implosion. In the first of the two unpublished adventures, the boys are pitted against giant lobsters and the Russian Navy. In the second, the Green Team faces a villain called the Paperhanger who has special wallpaper that grows plants and trees, and who is a dead ringer for Adolf Hitler.

In subsequent decades, the Green Team appeared in one panel of Animal Man #25 (July 1990), and a single page of Adventures of Superman #549 (Aug. 1997), in which the boys meet the Newsboy Legion and Dingbats of Danger Street, financing a youth center for the two street gangs. Writer Karl Kesel explained that he was a fan of the Newsboy Legion, and brought in the other two boy groups as a counterpoint to the Newsboys, since all three were created by Joe Simon and/or Jack Kirby. Cecil Sunbeam and Abdul Smith, two members of the Green Team, appear in Ambush Bug: Year None #1 (Sept. 2008).

As part of The New 52 reboot of DC's continuity, the Green Team and its sister book The Movement were re-established in 2013. Written by Art Baltazar and Franco Aureliani, and drawn by Ig Guara, the first issue debuted in May 2013 and focused on teens who use their financial resources to purchase power in the DC Universe, including super powers. This run lasted 8 issues and concluded in January 2014.

Fictional character biographies
The only prerequisite for joining the Green Team is possession of at least one million dollars, primarily in cash. The boys pay fortunes to anyone who can offer them a worthy adventure. In their first story, they fund the "Great American Pleasure Machine", a sort of roller coaster ride that brings so much pleasure, it drives the villain of the piece insane.

A text page in 1st Issue Special #2 (May 1975) explains, their jumpsuit uniforms have many pockets for money, with special locks, and they carry ticker-tape wristwatches, a chain of keys that unlock any of their many labs and money vaults in far-flung lands, and a quarter-million dollars each.

Membership

Original
Commodore Murphy - a boy shipping magnate.
J.P. Huston - a Texan oil tycoon.
Cecil Sunbeam - a Hollywood film director known as the "Starmaker".
Abdul Smith - an African-American shoeshine boy who received half a million dollars due to a bug in his bank's computer. He shrewdly multiplied that stake, returned it to the bank, and had a million dollars left.

The New 52
Commodore Murphy - the leader of the group, who is into electronics. He is also interested in superhero-related materials. He is affectionately referred to as "64" within the group, an inside joke related to his trust fund; he will inherit 64 trillion dollars from his family when he turns twenty-one. 
J.P. Houston - a Texan who comes from "old money". He is Latino and has a sister named Lucia Lynn (L.L.) who often spends time with the group. He has misgivings about Commodore's interest in "this superhero thing" and how it will affect the group.
Cecilia Sunbeam - a big-time actress. People whisper about her: "She's a celebrity, and she has all the problems that go with that".
Mohammad Qahtanii - a modern prince, and the youngest member of the Team.

References

External links
DCU Guide: The Green Team
Green Team at the Grand Comics Database
Green Team at Don Markstein's Toonopedia. Archived  from the original on August 29, 2016.

DC Comics titles
DC Comics superheroes
DC Comics teams
Comics characters introduced in 1975
Characters created by Joe Simon